Josef Bochníček may refer to:

 Josef Bochníček (gymnast) (1896–1969), Czech gymnast
 Josef Bochníček, head of the Czechoslovak bicycle factory Favorit